Virginia and Truckee Railroad No. 12, named Genoa, is a type 4-4-0 American standard gauge steam locomotive built by the Baldwin Locomotive Works in January 1873 for the Virginia and Truckee Railroad.

V&T Service 

Genoa was the second V&T passenger locomotive, as well as the second 4-4-0 the V&T acquired. Although it was designed for passenger service, it did pull mixed and occasionally freight trains. For 28 years, it hauled mainly passenger trains on the Virginia and Truckee Railroad, but it also hauled freight trains, between Carson City, Virginia City, and Reno, Nevada, on the V&T.

Excursion Service 

The locomotive was retired from service in 1908, and went into storage in the Carson City shops. In 1938 it was sold to Eastern Railroads in New York. It was restored to look like Central Pacific #60 Jupiter for the 1939 New York World's Fair. In 1940 it was presented to the Pacific Coast Chapter of the Railway and Locomotive Historical Society and shipped to the Western Pacific Roundhouse in Oakland, California. The engine went to the 1948 Chicago's Railroad fair where it once again appeared as Jupiter. In 1955, it operated on the Stockton Terminal & Eastern Railroad. In 1957 Genoa made a trip to San Francisco. In 1969 it appeared as Jupiter at the Gold Spike Centennial at Promontory, Utah, opposite it's sister locomotive #11 Reno dressed as Union Pacific 119. That year, it was donated to the state of Nevada and loaned to the museum.

Static Display 
After its last wood-fired operation under steam in May 1979, #12 was restored to its 1902 appearance. The restored locomotive then became part of the California State Railroad Museum's collection. It is displayed alongside a V&T coach, number 16. On a display of an example of a bridge from the late 19th century. In 2022, The Genoa was temporarily traded to the Nevada State Railroad Museum in Carson City, Nevada, for two years. In exchange for their #18 The Dayton, which was built in the Central Pacific Railroad shops in Sacramento.

References

4-4-0 locomotives
Baldwin locomotives
Individual locomotives of the United States
Preserved steam locomotives of Nevada
Railway locomotives introduced in 1873
Virginia and Truckee Railroad